Narasimha Konda is a hill near the town of Jonnawada in Nellore district of Andhra Pradesh in India. It is a Hindu pilgrimage center and the site of an ancient temple dedicated to Narasimha, the man-lion avatar of the god Vishnu.

Geography
Narasimha Konda is a small hill place 15 km away from Nellore and 5 km away from Jonnawada. According to rock inscriptions at the site, the temple was built by the Pallava king Narasimhavarman I.

Culture
It is a pilgrimage where Sri Lakshmi Narasimha Swamy temple is situated and where pilgrims visit the temple daily. The temple also holds celebrations for the holiday Krishna Janmashtami.

See also
 Narasimha

Hindu pilgrimage sites in India

References